= Rehab medicine =

Rehab medicine may refer to:

- Physical medicine and rehabilitation
- Drug rehabilitation
